Ticaco District is one of eight districts of the Tarata province in Peru.

Geography 
Some of the highest mountains of the district are listed below:

 Jach'a Sirka
 Jach'a T'aja Sirka
 Jaruma
 Jisk'a Qullu
 Phuru Phuruni
 P'isaqani
 Qutan Willk'i
 Timillu Qullu
 Titiri
 Yana K'achi

References